Paulo Alexandre Martins Guerra (born 21 August 1970 in Barrancos, Baixo Alentejo Province) is a Portuguese former long-distance runner who specialized in the 10,000 metres and cross-country running. After 2001 he mainly ran half marathons.

International competitions

Personal bests
1500 metres - 3:45.21 min (1995)
3000 metres - 7:49.94 min (1996)
3000 metres steeplechase - 8:43.86 min (1991)
5000 metres - 13:18.59 min (1995)
10,000 metres - 27:50.17 min (1998)
Half marathon - 1:01:53 hrs (1996)
Marathon - 2:11:02 hrs (1998)

External links

The World Cross Country Championships 1973-2005
Sports Reference profile

1970 births
Living people
People from Barrancos
Portuguese male long-distance runners
Portuguese male marathon runners
Portuguese male steeplechase runners
Olympic athletes of Portugal
Athletes (track and field) at the 1996 Summer Olympics
World Athletics Championships athletes for Portugal
European Cross Country Championships winners
Sportspeople from Beja District